Benton Harbor High School is a high school in Benton Harbor, Michigan, United States, and is part of the Benton Harbor Area Schools.

History
In 2009, the school received a $52,000 grant from the U.S. federal government's stimulus program to upgrade its cafeteria equipment. The school was eligible for the grant because more than half its students were eligible to receive free or reduced-cost school meals.

Demographics
The demographic breakdown of the 613 students enrolled in 2016-17 was:
Male - 50.7%
Female - 49.3%
Black - 94.5%
Hispanic - 2.1%
White - 1.8%
Multiracial - 1.6%

63.6% of the students were eligible for free or reduced-cost lunch.  In 2016–17, Benton Harbor was a Title I school.

Athletics
The Benton Harbor Tigers compete in the Lakeland Conference. The school colors are orange and black.  The following Michigan High School Athletic Association (MHSAA) sanctioned sports are offered:

Baseball (boys)
Basketball (girls and boys)
Boys state champion - 1941, 1944, 1964, 1965, 2018
Girls state champion - 2009
Cross country (girls and boys)
Football (boys)
Golf (boys)
Softball (girls)
Track (girls and boys)
Boys state champion - 1941, 1950, 1970
Girls state champion - 1984
Volleyball (girls)
Wrestling (boys)

Notable alumni
 Joique Bell, NFL football player
 Chris Burkam, MLB player (St. Louis Browns)
 Wilson Chandler, NBA player, first round pick (#23) in draft; named Mr. Basketball in 2005
 Tyrone Evans Clark, filmmaker, actor, video game designer, and musician
 Kysre Gondrezick, WNBA basketball player
 Don Hopkins, MLB player (Oakland Athletics)
 Ernie Hudson, actor
 Iris Kyle, professional bodybuilder
 Dave Machemer, professional baseball player
 Anthony Miller, NBA player for several teams
 William Perigo, former University of Michigan basketball head coach, coached Benton Harbor High
 Sinbad, comedian and actor
 Chet Walker, NBA basketball player in Hall of Fame
 Robert Whaley, NBA player

References

External links
 

Public high schools in Michigan
Schools in Berrien County, Michigan
Benton Harbor, Michigan